3/7 may refer to:
March 7 (month-day date notation)
July 3 (day-month date notation)
3rd Battalion, 7th Marines, an infantry battalion of the United States Marine Corps
3/7 (number), a fraction